The 1944 United States presidential election in Oklahoma took place on November 7, 1944, as part of the 1944 United States presidential election. Voters chose ten representatives, or electors, to the Electoral College, who voted for president and vice president.

Oklahoma was won by incumbent President Franklin D. Roosevelt (D–New York), running with Senator Harry S. Truman, with 55.57% of the popular vote, against  Governor Thomas E. Dewey (R–New York), running with Governor John Bricker, with 44.20% of the popular vote.

Results

Results by county

See also
 United States presidential elections in Oklahoma

References

Oklahoma
1944
1944 Oklahoma elections